Events in the year 1546 in Japan.

Incumbents
Monarch: Go-Nara

Deaths
January 21 - Azai Sukemasa (b. 1491), daimyō

References

 
1540s in Japan
Japan
Years of the 16th century in Japan